Liu Junpeng (former Chinese character name ; born 20 May 1983) is a Chinese footballer who currently plays for Taizhou Yuanda in the China League One.

Club career
Liu Junpeng started his football career with China League Two side Beijing Hongdeng. Liu joined Beijing Baxy in 2010 when Beijing Hongdeng's position was taken over by Beijing Baxy. He scored his first senior goal on 22 April 2010 in a 3–1 away win against Nanjing Yoyo.

Liu transferred to China League One side Fujian Smart Hero in 2012. He made his debut for the club on 17 March 2012, in a 1–1 home draw against Yanbian Changbai Tiger. Fujian moved to Hebei Province's capital city Shijiazhuang in 2013. He played 18 league matches in the 2014 season as Shijiazhuang won promotion to the Chinese Super League. On 3 June 2015, Liu made his Super League debut in a 2–2 home draw against Shanghai SIPG. He left the club at the end of 2017 season after the expiration of contract.

Career statistics 
Statistics accurate as of match played 28 November 2020.

References

1983 births
Living people
Chinese footballers
Footballers from Dalian
Association football defenders
Chinese Super League players
China League One players
China League Two players
Beijing Hongdeng players
Beijing Sport University F.C. players
Cangzhou Mighty Lions F.C. players
Taizhou Yuanda F.C. players